Serafim Kalliadasis is an applied mathematician and chemical engineer working at Imperial College London since 2004.

Career 
Serafim Kalliadasis earned a five-year undergraduate degree in chemical engineering at the Polytechnic School of the Aristotle University of Thessaloniki, Greece. He graduated in 1989. In 1990 he started his PhD studies at the University of Notre Dame, USA. His doctoral thesis was in the general of fluid dynamics and was supervised by Prof. H.-C. Chang.

Following his PhD in 1994 he moved on to the University of Bristol, UK, as post-doctoral fellow in applied mathematics.

In 1995 he took up his first academic position at the Chemical Engineering Department of the University of Leeds, UK. In 2004 he was appointed to Readership in Fluid Mechanics at Department of Chemical Engineering, Imperial College, UK, in 2004 and was promoted to Professor in Engineering Science & Applied Mathematics at Imperial College in 2010.

Research 
Serafim Kalliadasis' expertise is in the interface between Applied and Computational Mathematics, Complex Systems and Engineering, covering both fundamentals and applications. He leads the Complex Multiscale Systems Group of Imperial College London.

Distinctions 

 2020, Institute of Mathematics and its Applications Fellow.
 2019, Institute of Physics Fellow.
 2014, American Physical Society Fellow. Citation reads: “For pioneering and rigorous contributions to fundamental fluid dynamics, particularly interfacial flows and dynamics of moving contact lines, statistical mechanics of inhomogeneous liquids, and coarse graining of complex multiscale systems.”
 2010–2016, ERC Frontier Research Advanced Investigator Grant holder.
 2009, Corporate Member and Fellow of IChemE.
 2004–2009, EPSRC Advanced Fellowship.

Selected publications 

 Carrillo, J.A., Kalliadasis, S., Perez, S.P. & Shu, C.-W. 2020 “Well-balanced finite-volume schemes for hydrodynamic equations with general free energy,” SIAM Multiscale Model. Sim. 18 502–541
 Gomes, S.N., Kalliadasis, S., Pavliotis, G.A. & Yatsyshin, P. 2019 “Dynamics of the Desai-Zwanzig model in multiwell and random energy landscapes,” Phys. Rev. E 99 Art. No. 032109 (13 pp)
 Schmuck, M., Pavliotis, G.A. & Kalliadasis, S. 2019 “Recent advances in the evolution of interfaces: thermodynamics, upscaling, and universality,” Comp. Mater. Sci. 156 441–451 (Special issue following Euromat2017 conference)
 Yatsyshin, P., Parry, A.O., Rascón, C. & Kalliadasis, S. 2018 ``Wetting of a plane with a narrow solvophobic stripe,” Mol. Phys. 116 1990–1997 (Special issue following Thermodynamics 2017 conference)
 Yatsyshin, P., Durán-Olivencia, M.A. & Kalliadasis, S. 2018 “Microscopic aspects of wetting using classical density functional theory,” J. Phys.-Condens. Matt. 30 Art. No. 274003 (9 pp) (Invited paper—special issue on “Physics of Integrated Microfluidics”)
 Dallaston, M.C., Fontelos, M.A., Tseluiko, D. & Kalliadasis S. 2018 “Discrete self-similarity in interfacial hydrodynamics and the formation of iterated structures,” Phys. Rev. Lett. 120} Art. No. 034505 (5 pp)
 Braga, C., Smith, E.R., Nold, A., Sibley, D.N. & Kalliadasis, S. 2018 “The pressure tensor across a liquid-vapour interface,” J. Chem. Phys. 149 Art. No. 044705 (8 pp)
 Schmuck, M. & Kalliadasis, S. 2017 “Rate of convergence of general phase field equations in strongly heterogeneous media towards their homogenized limit,” SIAM J. Appl. Math. 77 1471–1492
 Nold, A., Goddard, B.D., Yatsyshin, P., Savva, N. & Kalliadasis, S. 2017 “Pseudospectral methods for density functional theory in bounded and unbounded domains,” J. Comp. Phys. 334 639–664
 Durán-Olivencia, M.A., Yatsyshin, P., Goddard, B.D. & Kalliadasis, S. 2017 “General framework for fluctuating dynamic density functional theory,” New J. Phys. 19 Art. No. 123022 (16 pp)

References 

Year of birth missing (living people)
British mathematicians
Living people
Fellows of the American Physical Society